Magnifique may refer to:
 French ship Magnifique, 1814
 Magnifique-class ship of the line
 French ship Magnifique (1750)
 Magnifique (album), an album by Ratatat